My Korean Jagiya ( / ) is a Philippine television drama romance comedy series broadcast by GMA Network. Directed by Mark A. Reyes, it stars Heart Evangelista and Alexander Lee. It premiered on August 21, 2017 on the network's Telebabad line up replacing I Heart Davao. The series concluded on January 12, 2018 with a total of 105 episodes. It was replaced by The One That Got Away in its timeslot.

The series is the first Philippine television drama series produced by GMA Network to be filmed in Seoul, South Korea. The series is streaming online on YouTube.

Premise
Gia often teased that she is next in her family to become an old maid, is a Korean drama fan with determination to meet her long-time crush and former Korean superstar Kim Jun-ho, who has since stepped out of the limelight. When her school offers her a scholarship training in Seoul, she grabs the opportunity to try and find Jun-ho, but ends up coming home disappointed. Back in Manila, she helps a drunk Korean guy beaten by gangsters which turned out to be Jun-ho.

Cast and characters

Lead cast
 Heart Evangelista as Guadalupe Immaculada "Gia" Asuncion-Kim
 Alexander Lee as Kim Jun-ho

Supporting cast
 Janice de Belen as Adelaida "Aida" Asuncion
 Ricky Davao as Joselito "Josie" Asuncion
 Iya Villania as Kennedy Santos
 Edgar Allan Guzman as Ryan Patrick Maalba
 Valeen Montenegro as Cindy / Cinnamon
 Frances Makil-Ignacio as Caridad “Carrie” Washington
 Myke Solomon as Kerwin
 Jinri Park as Lee Kyung-ha / Hannah Lee
 Divine Aucina as Clarissa Asuncion
 Khaine Hernandez as Paolo "Pao" Kim

Recurring cast
 Shelly Hipolito as Scarlet Asuncion
 Gileth Sandico as Pebbles Asuncion-Santos
 Don Martin as Rocky Santos
 Raymart Santiago as Dodong "Dong" / "Doods" Garcia

Guest cast
 Kim Jung-wook as Kim Ji-hu
 Oh Min-lee (Michelle Oh) as Kim Yea-jin
 Lee Hae-ri as Choi
 Kim Sun-hi as Jun-ho's interviewer
 Dasuri Choi as a film actress
 Rob Sy as Gia's workmate
 Liezel Lopez as Nadine
 Erlinda Villalobos as Dora Asuncion
 Boboy Garovillo as Ernesto Garcia
 Dexter Doria as Ludivina Garcia
 Mickey Ferriols as Carmela “Mel” Tuazon
 Andy Ryu as Lee Gong-woo
 Jaclyn Jose as Charlotte "Chiclet" TIborcia
 Cheska Iñigo as Amanda de Gracia

Ratings
According to AGB Nielsen Philippines' Nationwide Urban Television Audience Measurement People in television homes, the pilot episode of My Korean Jagiya earned a 6.6% rating. While the final episode scored an 8.5% rating. The series had its highest rating on November 3, 2017 with an 8.7% rating.

References

External links
 
 

2017 Philippine television series debuts
2018 Philippine television series endings
Filipino-language television shows
GMA Network drama series
Philippine romantic comedy television series
Television shows set in Hong Kong
Television shows set in the Philippines
Television shows set in Seoul